A Sound of Trumpets is a 1964 Australian drama directed by Henri Safran.

Premise
A family want to adopt a refugee boy.

Cast
Nigel Lovell
Henry Gilbert
Peter Wagner
Mark McManus

Reception
The Sydney Morning Herald criticised the "excessive detail" and called it "dour, plodding, earnest" but said it "explored its chosen situation thoroughly enough to illuminate not so much a social problem as the complex interdependence of ordinary family life."

Only Janice   Dinnen’s   remarkably   mature   performance   as   the  eldest   daughter and Ethel   Gabriel’s  complaining   grandmother   achieved   any semblance   of   sympathy or credibility."

See also
List of television plays broadcast on Australian Broadcasting Corporation (1960s)

References

External links
A Sound of Trumpets at IMDb

1964 television plays
Australian television plays
Australian Broadcasting Corporation original programming
Black-and-white Australian television shows
English-language television shows